Masyanya is a Russian adult animated sitcom and web series (later released on TV) created by Oleg Kuvaev with Macromedia Flash in 2001.

Characters

Main Cast
 Masyanya (Масяня Masânâ; real name Maria) - The title character and the eponymous heroine in her twenties who lives in an apartment in St. Petersburg. Masyanya has an oval-shaped head and always wears a miniskirt and a shirt with a bare midriff.
 Hryundel (Хрюндель Hrûndelʼ, a derivative from Russian verb meaning "to grunt"; real name Alexander) - Masyanya's rather dense, good-natured, overall-clad boyfriend.
 Lokhmaty (Лохматый Lohmatıĭ, Russian for "Shaggy"; real name Anton Lokhmatenko) - their friend, a pudgy and care-free drummer. Lokhmaty is later revealed to be of Ukrainian descent, his last name being Lokhmatenko.

Side Characters
 Fyodorovna (Фёдоровна Fëdorovna) - Masyanya's mother. Given name and occupation are unknown. She is divorced.
 Lyaska (Ляська Lâs'ka; real name Olga) - a girl from Moscow and Masyanya's friend.
 Sanyok (Санёк Sanëk, a derivative of the full name Alexander) - homeless in a green sweater, who lives in the basement of Masyanya's house 
 Dyadya Badya (Дядя Бадя Dâdâ Badâ) - son of Masyanya and Hryundel.
 Chuchunya (Чучуня Čučunâ) - daughter of Masyanya and Hryundel.
 Grisha Chaynikov (Гриша Чайников Griša Čaĭnikov) - music producer.
 Kolobukhin - bass guitar player.
 Putin (Путин) - the president of Russia, often referred to as the czar.

Episodes
A typical Masyanya episode is only a few minutes long. Each .swf episode was typically 170-400KB in size (though sometimes up to 3MB), and consisted mainly of sarcastic (and frequently absurd) commentary on contemporary Russian life. Some of the most popular episodes include one in which Masyanya and Hryundel' snicker and later hysterically laugh while Hryundel' is recording a jingle on the radio; another involves a sexual encounter made impossible by the lack of "shtuchki" (thingies), while yet another involves the two main characters exchanging a series of increasingly awful gifts, including a horse-shaped piñata and a bag of green cats.

The episodes are generally loosely connected and the characters initially did not age. For most of the episodes, no particular sequence or storyline could be established until recently as Masyanya and Hryundel now have two kids Uncle Badya and Chuchun. They can be watched in any order, but some episodes lose a great deal of their charm if one isn't familiar with at least some of the series history.

Soundtrack

Russian pop songs are often used in the soundtracks of episodes. Several episodes are, in essence, music videos set to a particular song.

Reception

Masyanyas popularity is rapidly growing on both sides of the Atlantic. In Russia, Masyanya made the move from the Internet to television and can now be seen on several cartoons and talk shows, although its popularity is mainly supported by the Internet. In Germany, translations are being made of some of the more popular episodes. In the United States, Masyanya has become an integral feature of the Middlebury College Summer Russian Language Program in Vermont.

Censorship in Russia

At the height of the 2022 Russian invasion of Ukraine, the series broadcast episode 160 titled Vakidzasi (Вакидзаси; Wakizashi) on March 22, which was strongly critical of the conflict in Ukraine; the episode had featured graphic images taken from the conflict while also comparing president Vladimir Putin and his actions as that of Adolf Hitler's and stating that the only right decision Putin could make in his life would be one to commit suicide. The episode ends on a happy note after Putin follows said advice in-universe. The show stayed the course with the next two episodes, 161 Kak ob'yasnit detyam (Как объяснить детям; How to explain [everything] to children) from May 13 in which Masyanya and Hryundel explain the circumstances leading to the war to Badya and Chuchunya, and 162 "" (Санкт-Мариубург; Sankt-Mariuburg) from July 11 in which China invades Russia in the same manner as Russia did Ukraine in real life, and Saint Petersburg, where the episode takes place, is destroyed in the same manner as Mariupol.

In response, Russian media regulation agency Roskomnadzor, after having demanded the creators of Masyanya to pull the episode, banned the series after accusing the creators for circulating false information about the conflict. Kuvayev, who currently lives in Israel, had circumvented the take down of the original webpage by creating a mirror site, but as of 2 April the authorities continue to threaten Kuvayev that all of his internet resources will be blocked unless the episode was pulled out.

References

External links 

 Original website (Defunct)

 

2001 web series debuts
Russian adult animated comedy television series
Flash animated web series
Crowdfunded web series
YouTube original programming
2022 Russian invasion of Ukraine in popular culture
Cultural depictions of Vladimir Putin